Iroquois-class homeodomain protein IRX-6, also known as Iroquois homeobox protein 6, is a protein that in humans is encoded by the IRX6 gene.

Function 

IRX6 is a member of the Iroquois homeobox gene family. Members of this family appear to play multiple roles during pattern formation of vertebrate embryos.

References

Further reading